El Fresno is one of 28 parishes (administrative divisions) in the municipality of Grado, within the province and autonomous community of Asturias, in northern Spain. 

The population is 140 (INE 2007).

Villages and hamlets
 Alvaré
 El Bondello
 La Caridad
 Los Fornos
 El Fresno
 Los Macetes
 Las Novales
 La Tronca

References

Parishes in Grado